The Nikos Chatzikyriakos-Gikas Art Gallery is an art museum and gallery in Athens, Greece.

Museums in Athens
Art museums and galleries in Greece